Al-Ghat (Arabic: El-Gh'at الغاط') or Elghat  "Alghat" is a small town in Riyadh Province, Saudi Arabia. As of the 2016 census it had a population of 16500  people.

A joint Saudi-Belgian Mission (2013–14) confirmed the archaeological, epigraphic and historic high potential of the Al-Ghat region.

See also

 List of cities and towns in Saudi Arabia
 Regions of Saudi Arabia

References

Populated places in Riyadh Province